Leporellus is a genus of headstanders found in South America. They are mainly found in the São Francisco River and Paraná–Paraguay river basins, but L. vittatus also occurs in the Amazon.  There are currently four described species in this genus.

Species
Leporellus cartledgei Fowler, 1941
Leporellus pictus (Kner, 1858)
Leporellus retropinnis (C. H. Eigenmann, 1922)
Leporellus vittatus (Valenciennes, 1850)

References
 

Anostomidae
Taxa named by Christian Frederik Lütken